Jhuma Solanki is an Indian politician and a member of the Indian National Congress party.

Personal life 
She is married to Dr. Dhyan Singh Solanki and has two daughters.

Political career 
She became an MLA for the first time in 2013.

See also 
 2013 Madhya Pradesh Legislative Assembly election

References

External links 
 

1965 births
Living people
Indian National Congress politicians from Madhya Pradesh
21st-century Indian women politicians
21st-century Indian politicians
Madhya Pradesh MLAs 2013–2018
Women members of the Madhya Pradesh Legislative Assembly